Discovery Gospel Choir is an over 30 member intercultural choir based in Dublin, Ireland. The choir was founded in 2004 as part of the Church of Ireland's 5-year Discovery Project - an initiative to welcome migrants and encourage social integration in Ireland. As of 2006, they were based at Dublin's Sts. George and Thomas Church, which was the only state-built Church of Ireland parish.

In 2009 the Discovery Project ended and the choir developed into an inter-denominational, professional choir. It is directed by Róisín Dexter and is partially supported by the Church of Ireland and Dublin City Council.

References

External links
 

Irish choirs
Musical groups established in 2004